Morgan Park is a neighborhood in Baltimore, Maryland, located immediately east of Morgan State University.

References

Neighborhoods in Baltimore
Northeast Baltimore